Peter Nelson Crossland  (born May 8, 1937) is a former member of the Ohio House of Representatives.

Early life
Crossland earned a B.A. from Miami University in 1959. He attained a B.D. from Yale University in 1963 and a Ph.D. from Duke University in 1966. From 1966 to 1995, Crossland was a Professor of Political Science at Kent State University.

Political career

Ohio House of Representative
Crossland was a member of the Ohio House of Representatives from 1973 to 1983 before he was appointed as Assistant Director of the Ohio Department of Youth Services by Governor Richard Celeste.

While a member of the Ohio House of Representatives, Crossland authored 17 bills that were enacted into law and also served as chairman of the House Finance and Human Services committees.

Summit County Council
Crossland served as a member of the Summit County Council for 22 years.  He began his first term on the council as an at-large member in 1988. He was then elected as the District 4 representative, serving from 1993 to 2006. District 4 is composed of portions of west, north and central Akron. As a county councilman, Crossland championed efforts to establish fiscal stability for the county by pushing through and then removing a temporary tax. In 2001, he received an Environmental Awareness Award, presented by the Summit Soil and Water Conservation District, for his distinguished leadership on innovative riparian legislation.

He is currently a Professor Emeritus of Political Science at Kent State University.

United States House of Representatives
In 2014, Crossland unsuccessfully challenged U.S. Representative Jim Renacci for Ohio's 16th congressional district

References

Democratic Party members of the Ohio House of Representatives
Miami University alumni
Yale Divinity School alumni
Duke University alumni
Kent State University faculty
Living people
1937 births